Navarro is a Spanish, Portuguese, Italian and French surname. Navarro is a habitational surname denoting someone from Navarre (Basque: Nafarroa) after the Kingdom of Pamplona took on the new naming in the high Middle Ages, while also keeping its original meaning of 'Basque-speaking person' in a broader sense, an ethnic surname. Ultimately the name is derived from the Basque word naba (meaning 'plain next to mountains'). (Spanish) One who came from Navarro (plain among hills), an ancient kingdom in Spain. The surname, Navarro, was born as a nickname given to Navarre gentlemen-knights who participated in the Spanish reconquest. Besides the surname Navarro was expanded throughout Valencia.

Notable people with the surname 
 Aguas Santas Ocaña Navarro, Honduran first lady
 Aida Navarro, Venezuelan singer
 Alan Navarro, English footballer
 Alejandro Navarro, Chilean politician
 Ana Navarro, Nicaraguan American CNN News Commentator
 Anna Navarro, American film and television actress
 Ángel Navarro, settler
 Australia Navarro, Spanish politician
 Ben Navarro (born 1962/1963), American billionaire, founder and CEO of Sherman Financial Group, son of Frank
 Brenda Navarro (born 1982), Mexican writer
 Carla Suárez Navarro, Spanish tennis player
 Carlos Arias Navarro, Spanish politician
 Charles Navarro, American 
 Christian Navarro (born 1991), American actor
 Chucho Navarro, singer
 Dafne Navarro (born 1996), Mexican trampoline gymnast
 Daniel Navarro, cyclist
 Dave Navarro, Mexican-American rock guitarist, best known for playing in Jane's Addiction and Red Hot Chili Peppers
 David Navarro (disambiguation)
 Dioner Navarro, baseball player
 Efren Navarro, baseball player
 Elvira Navarro (born 1978), Spanish writer
 Emilio Navarro, baseball player
 Ernesto de la Guardia Navarro, Panamanian president
 Fats Navarro, jazz trumpet player
 Felipe Navarro García, Spanish journalist, better known for his nickname Yale
 Fernando Navarro Corbacho, Spanish footballer
 Francisco Yeste Navarro, former Spanish-Basque footballer (Athletic Bilbao) 
 Franco Navarro, Peruvian  footballer, manager, and coach
 Frank Navarro (1931–2021), American football player and coach
 García Navarro (Luis Antonio García Navarro), Spanish conductor
 Guillermo Navarro, Mexican cinematographer
 Hilario Navarro Argentine football goalkeeper
 Ibon Navarro, Spanish basketball coach
 Iván Navarro (tennis), Spanish tennis player
 Jason Navarro, American punk rock musician, vocalist in  The Suicide Machines
 Javi Navarro (disambiguation), multiple people
 Juan José Navarro, Captain General of the Spanish Navy.
 Johnny Navarro, British musician, vocalist and guitarist in  Devilish Presley
 José Antonio Navarro, Texas statesman, revolutionary, and politician
 Juan Carlos Navarro (basketball), Spanish basketball player
 Juan Carlos Navarro (politician), Panamanian politician
 Julio Navarro (astrophysicist), Argentinian Professor of Astronomy
 Julio Navarro (baseball), Puerto Rican baseball player
 Kenn Navarro, Filipino-American animator of Happy Tree Friends
 Kimberly Navarro, American ice dancer
 Manel Navarro, Spanish singer
 Mariano Navarro Rubio, Spanish politician
 Marysa Navarro (born 1934), Spanish-American historian 
 Myriam Hernández Navarro, Chilean singer-songwriter and television presenter
 Nancy Navarro, member of the Montgomery County Council in Maryland, USA
 Natalia Navarro, Miss Colombia 2009
 Nelson Navarro, Curaçaoan politician
 Nicolás Navarro (Mexican footballer), Mexican football goalkeeper
 Nick Navarro, Cuban-American sheriff and businessman
 Pedro Navarro, Count of Oliveto, Spanish 16th century engineer and general
 Peter Navarro, American economist, Director of the Office of Trade and Manufacturing Policy, Trump Administration
 Rafael Sánchez Navarro, Spanish-Mexican actor
 Ray Navarro, American artist, filmmaker, and HIV/AIDS activist
 Robert Navarro (politician) (born 1952), French politician
 Robert Navarro (footballer) (born 2002), Spanish footballer
 Roberto Navarro (born 1988), boxer from the Dominican Republic
 Roberto Navarro (journalist) (born 1959), Argentine journalist
 Rosita L. Navarro, Filipina president of Centro Escolar University in Manila
 Ryan Navarro, American football player
 Samantha Navarro, Uruguayan singer and composer
 Samuel Lewis Navarro, Panamanian politician
 Sergio Navarro, Chilean football player
 Sergio Navarro (football manager), Spanish association football manager
 Vhong Navarro, Filipino actor, singer, and host at ABS-CBN
 Yamaico Navarro, Dominican Republic baseball player
 Yvonne Navarro, American author

See also
 Novarro
 Novaro

References

Spanish-language surnames
Italian-language surnames
Sephardic surnames
Toponymic surnames
Ethnonymic surnames